Mount Minto (previously, Conical Hill) is a mountain located on northern Bell Peninsula, Southampton Island, in Kivalliq Region, Nunavut, Canada. From eastward, it has a conical shape.

It is named after Gilbert Elliot-Murray-Kynynmound, 2nd Earl of Minto, first Lord of the Admiralty.

References

Mountains of Kivalliq Region
Mountains of Canada under 1000 metres